Woltmann is a German surname. Notable people with the surname include:

Alfred Woltmann (1841–1880), German art historian
Benjamin Woltmann (born 1990), German footballer
Frederick Woltmann (1908–1965), American composer
Ludwig Woltmann (1871–1907), German anthropologist, zoologist and Marxist theoretical

See also
Woltman

German-language surnames